The Ageron was a French automobile manufactured in Lyon between 1910 and 1914.  Most cars of this marque were friction drive one-, two-, or four-cylinder light cars that used 6, 8, or 10 hp (4.5, 6, or 7.5 kW) engines.

Brass Era vehicles
Defunct motor vehicle manufacturers of France
Manufacturing companies based in Lyon